was a Japanese politician who was the first opposition member to serve as the President of the House of Councillors in Japan. Eda had served for three terms in the House of Councillors before his election as President on 7 August 2007, after the success of the Democratic Party in the July 2007 election for the Japanese House of Councillors. He had earlier served four terms in the House of Representatives of Japan. Eda was also the head of the Science and Technology Agency.

Biography
Eda graduated the University of Tokyo having passed the Japanese bar examination while studying in its law faculty. He elected to serve as a judge while undergoing training at the Legal Research and Training Institute, and worked as an assistant judge in Tokyo, Chiba and Yokohama. In 1969, he won a government scholarship to attend Linacre College, Oxford (together with then-Finance Ministry bureaucrat Haruhiko Kuroda, who went on to head the Bank of Japan).

Eda's father, Socialist Democratic Federation co-founder Saburō Eda, died unexpectedly in May 1977, on the eve of a Japanese House of Councillors election in July. Eda was quickly enlisted as a SDF at-large candidate to take his father's place, and won a seat. He served until July 1983, when he declined to run in the House of Councillors election that year and instead stood in the Japanese general election in December, where he won a seat representing the Okayama 1st District. He held this seat until 1996, when he resigned to unsuccessfully run for Governor of Okayama Prefecture. From 1985 to 1994 he was the president of the Socialist Democratic Federation.

Eda returned to the House of Councillors in the 1998 election as a member of the Democratic Party of Japan. He served in the upper house until 2016, when he retired from politics at the age of 74. He died of pneumonia on 28 July 2021 at the age of 80.

References

External links 
 Official site

|-

|-

|-

|-

|-

|-

|-

1941 births
2021 deaths
Alumni of Linacre College, Oxford
Democratic Party of Japan politicians
Government ministers of Japan
20th-century Japanese judges
Members of the House of Councillors (Japan)
Members of the House of Representatives (Japan)
Ministers of Justice of Japan
People from Okayama
Socialist Democratic Federation (Japan) politicians
University of Tokyo alumni
Presidents of the House of Councillors (Japan)